The 1897 Harvard Crimson football team represented Harvard University in the 1897 college football season. The Crimson finished with a 10–1–1 record and shut out 10 of 12 opponents under first-year head coach William Cameron Forbes, who later served as Governor-General of the Philippines (1908–13) and Ambassador of the United States to Japan (1930–32).  The 1897 team won its first ten games by a combined 227-5 score.  It then closed the season playing to a scoreless tie with Yale and losing by a 15-6 score against Penn.

Two Harvard players received consensus honors on the 1897 College Football All-America Team: center Allan Doucette and halfback Benjamin Dibblee. Other notable players on Harvard's 1897 team included end Norman Cabot and tackle Malcolm Donald.

Schedule

References

Harvard
Harvard Crimson football seasons
Harvard Crimson football
19th century in Boston